Brasside is a suburban village near Durham, located in the civil parish of Framwellgate Moor in County Durham, England. It is situated to the north of Durham, and is close to the villages of Pity Me and Newton Hall.

Brasside is the location of Frankland Prison (for men), and Low Newton Prison (Closed prison for female adults and young offenders). Both establishments are maximum security prisons, holding some of the most violent and dangerous inmates within HM Prison Service, the prison system of England and Wales.

The theme park "Adventure Valley" is situated in Brasside.

Areas of Durham, England